Gonocephalus grandis, the giant forest dragon or great anglehead lizard, is a species of agamid lizard. It is found in Thailand, Vietnam, Malaysia, Indonesia, and Myanmar.

References

Gonocephalus
Reptiles of Indonesia
Reptiles described in 1845
Taxa named by John Edward Gray
Reptiles of Borneo
Reptiles of the Malay Peninsula
Fauna of Sumatra